The 1975 New Hampshire Wildcats football team was an American football team that represented the University of New Hampshire as a member of the Yankee Conference during the 1975 NCAA Division II football season. In its fourth year under head coach Bill Bowes, the team compiled a 9–3 record (5–0 against conference opponents) and won the Yankee Conference championship.

Schedule

References

New Hampshire
New Hampshire Wildcats football seasons
Yankee Conference football champion seasons
New Hampshire Wildcats football